California's 2nd State Senate district is one of 40 California State Senate districts. It is currently represented by Democrat Mike McGuire of Healdsburg.

District profile 
The district stretches along the North Coast from the Oregon border in the north to the Golden Gate Bridge and the San Francisco Bay Area in the south. The northern part of district is primarily rural, while the southern parts are more suburban.

All of  Del Norte County
 Crescent City

All of Humboldt County
 Arcata 
 Blue Lake 
 Eureka 
 Ferndale 
 Fortuna 
 Rio Dell 
 Trinidad

All of  Lake County
 Clearlake
 Lakeport

All of Marin County
 Belvedere 
 Corte Madera 
 Fairfax 
 Larkspur 
 Mill Valley 
 Novato 
 Ross 
 San Anselmo 
 San Rafael 
 Sausalito 
 Tiburon

All of Mendocino County
 Fort Bragg
 Point Arena
 Ukiah
 Willits

All of Trinity County
 Burnt Ranch
 Coffee Creek
 Douglas City
 Hayfork
 Hyampom
 Junction City
 Lewiston
 Mad River
 Ruth
 Trinity Center
 Trinity Village
 Weaverville
 
Sonoma County – 71.5%
Cloverdale
Geyserville
Healdsburg
Santa Rosa
Sebastopol
Windsor

Election results from statewide races

List of senators 
Due to redistricting, the 2nd district has been moved around different parts of the state. The current iteration resulted from the 2001 redistricting by the California State Legislature.

Election results 1994 - present

2022 

Mike McGuire (Democratic) of Healdsburg, incumbent State Senator, running for a third term.
Gene Yoon (Republican), lawyer

Results

2018

2014

2010

2006

2002

1998

1994

See also 
 California State Senate
 California State Senate districts
 Districts in California

References

External links 
 District map from the California Citizens Redistricting Commission

02
Government of Del Norte County, California
Government of Humboldt County, California
Government of Lake County, California
Government of Marin County, California
Government of Mendocino County, California
Government of Sonoma County, California
Government of Trinity County, California
Corte Madera, California
Crescent City, California
Eureka, California
Lakeport, California
Larkspur, California
Mill Valley, California
Novato, California
San Anselmo, California
San Rafael, California
Santa Rosa, California
Sausalito, California
Tiburon, California
Ukiah, California
Weaverville, California